Caecum digitulum is a species of minute sea snail, a marine gastropod mollusc or micromollusc in the family Caecidae.

References

Further reading 
 Powell A. W. B., New Zealand Mollusca, William Collins Publishers Ltd, Auckland, New Zealand 1979 

Caecidae
Gastropods described in 1904